Manjuyod, officially the Municipality of Manjuyod,  is a 2nd class municipality in the province of Negros Oriental, Philippines. According to the 2020 census, it has a population of 44,799 people.

Geography

Barangays
Manjuyod is politically subdivided into 27 barangays.

Climate

Demographics

Economy

Tourism

Tourist attractions in Manjuyod include the Himampangon Cave, a natural rock formation; the white sand bar, a narrow seven kilometer strip of white beach sand; and the Candabong forest, there are many species living in Candabong forest which is protected by the government.

Festival
Saint Francis of Assisi is the patron saint of Manjuyod, and his feast day is celebrated annually October 4 with the town fiesta. The fiesta is an official non-working holiday for the town.

References

External links

 [ Philippine Standard Geographic Code]
Philippine Census Information
Local Governance Performance Management System

Municipalities of Negros Oriental